Zoobles! Spring to Life! is a pet simulation role-playing game based on the Zoobles! toyline by Spin Master. Developed by Japanese game developer Now Production and published by Activision, the game was released on the Nintendo DS on November 1, 2011, in United States and November 6, 2011, in Europe.

Gameplay
Zoobles! Spring to Life! is a simulation role-playing game with a few puzzle elements, similar to Harvest Moon. The Player starts by choosing the region he/she must play first. There are 6 regions to choose, though the other 5 regions must be unlocked by completing the first region, Petagonia. After choosing said region, the player must choose one of the three zoobles to take control of and after choosing said Zooble, the game begins.

Gameplay is dependent on the Nintendo DS's touchscreen or using the directional buttons and both the A and B buttons. However, some of the game's minigames can only be played with the touchscreen or the microphone feature. The game takes control on the Zooble the player chose in the region selection screen and controls its actions using the touchscreen or the directional keypads. Also like other pet simulation games, the player must watch over the Zooble's hunger, playfulness and cleanness. For its hunger, the player must feed it with either fruits which can be obtained from trees or vegetables that the player grows in its garden. For its activeness, the Player must make the Zooble participate in some Minigames to increase its activity meter and for its cleanness, the player's Zooble must take a bath once a day. The game also has a Day/Night Cycle system, if when the player's Zooble is tired, it must return to its Happitat and put it to sleep.

Interacting with the player's Zooble or meeting other Zoobles lets it earn Zoints, which were important for unlocking other Zoobles in the game, a spring and a slide for the player's Zooble to play with. Also, interacting with other Zoobles and playing minigames can earn more Zoints and when the player collected enough Zoints, the player can advance to another region, thought he cannot take the Zooble the player chose to that new region and must choose a new Zooble to advance. Aside from Zoints, the player must also collect certain items such as Acorns, Fireflies or Snowflakes. Depending on each region, these items can unlock furniture for the player to decorate its Happitat. Also, when the player gives a certain fruit or vegetable to the Zooble the player befriends to, the player will receive recipe items necessary for the baking minigame. Another feature in the game is the Wikizoob, where it tracks the Information of the Zooble the player unlocked in the game.

Minigames
The Minigames in the game include the spring game where the player must tap the touchscreen at the right time to jump higher to collect the balloons and tapping the right symbol to finish. Other minigames include the jump-rope game, bathtub, hide and seek, baking and lastly, the party dance. If the player clears one of them, they will be rewarded with more Zoints to further clear the game.

Playable regions

Petagonia
The starting world in the game, Petagonia is the grassland region of the Zooble Isle, which acts as a home for all Zooble pets. Petagonia is rich in wildlife, singing birds and brightly colored flowers. It is rumored that the Zoobles of Petagonia are small and also, they have a big knack for adventure.

Playable Zoobles

NPC Zoobles

Music
The game's music is done by SOUND AMS, who also did the music for New LovePlus. Each of the music tracks were composed by Momo Michishita, Takayuki Saito, Masanori Otsuka and Etsuko Ichikawa.

References

External links
 Official Website (English)
 Zoobles! Spring to Life! at Nintendo.com

2004 video games
Nintendo DS-only games
Activision games
Nintendo DS games
Now Production games
Puzzle video games
Role-playing video games
Video games based on toys
Video games developed in Japan
Video games set on fictional islands
Virtual pet video games
Single-player video games